This is a list of feminist avant-garde artists of the 1970s.  The initial choice of artists for the list was based on their inclusion in Vienna's Sammlung Verbund, and its internationally-shown exhibition tour The Feminist Avant-Garde of the 1970s: Works from the Sammlung Verbund.

 Helena Almeida (1934–2018, Portugal)
 Eleanor Antin (born 1935, USA)
  (born 1939, NL)
 Lynda Benglis (born 1941, USA)
 Judith Bernstein (born 1942, USA)
 Renate Bertlmann (born 1943, Austria)
 Teresa Burga (born 1935, Peru)
 Marcella Campagnano (born 1941, IT)
 Judy Chicago (born 1939, USA)
  (born 1939, Austria)
 Lili Dujourie (born 1941, Belgium)
 Mary Beth Edelson (born 1933, USA)
  (born 1949, Germany)
 Valie Export (born 1940, Austria)
 Esther Ferrer (born 1937, Estland)
 Lynn Hershman Leeson (born 1941, USA)
 Alexis Hunter (1948–2014, USA)
 Sanja Iveković (born 1949, Croatia)
 Birgit Jürgenssen (1949–2003, Austria)
 Kirsten Justesen (born 1943, Denmark)
 Ketty La Rocca (1938–1976, Italy)
 Leslie Labowitz (born 1946, USA)
 Katalin Ladik (born 1942, Serbia)
  (born 1953, Austria)
 Suzanne Lacy (born 1945, USA)
 Suzy Lake (born 1947, USA)
 Karin Mack (born 1940, Austria)
 Ana Mendieta (1948–1985, Cuba/USA)
 Annette Messager (born 1943, France)
 Rita Myers (born 1947, USA)
 Lorraine O'Grady (born 1934, USA)
 ORLAN (born 1947, France)
 Gina Pane (1939–1990, France)
 Letícia Parente (1930–1991, Brazil)
 Ewa Partum (born 1945, Poland)
  (born 1945, Austria)
 Margot Pilz (born 1936, The Netherlands)
 Ulrike Rosenbach (born 1943, Germany)
 Martha Rosler (born 1943, USA)
  (born 1946, USA)
 Carolee Schneemann (1939–2019, USA)
 Lydia Schouten (born 1948, The Netherlands)
 Cindy Sherman (born 1957, USA)
 Penny Slinger (born 1947, UK)
 Annegret Soltau (born 1946, Germany)
 Hannah Wilke (1940–1993, USA)
 Martha Wilson (born 1947, USA)
 Nancy Wilson-Pajic (born 1941, USA)
 Francesca Woodman (1958–1981, USA)
 Nil Yalter (born 1938, Turkey)

References

Artists, feminist
Feminist artists
Artists by genre
Avant-garde artists of the 1970s,lList of feminist